The 2011 American Basketball Association All-Star Game was held in Jacksonville, Florida at the 15,000 seat Jacksonville Veterans Memorial Arena on February 26, 2011.

The East team was coached by Kevin Waters of the Jacksonville Giants, while the West team was coached by Steve Tucker of the Southeast Texas Mavericks.  The East defeated the West, 123–122, in front of an enthusiastic crowd of 4,488.  Kayode Ayeni of the Jersey Express was named Most Valuable Player. J. R. VanHoose of the East Kentucky Energy won the 3-Point Contest.

All-Star Teams

East
G Anthony Jackson, Columbus Riverballers
G Ramar Smith, Georgia Gwizzlies
G Daniel Price, East Kentucky Energy
G JaLeel Nelson, Seven City Knights
G Anthony Muse, Chicago Steam
G Edward Horton, Jacksonville Giants
F Odgra Bobo, Lake Michigan Admirals
F Freeman Taylor, Gulf Coast Flash
F Sherrad Riddick, Savannah Storm
F Kayode Ayeni, Jersey Express
C Jermaine Bell, Jacksonville Giants
C J. R. VanHoose, East Kentucky Energy

Alternates
G Eric Ruffin, Seven City Knights
G Ralon Alman, West Virginia Blazers
G Germaine Williams, Fayetteville Flight
F Gus Chase, Lake Michigan Admirals

West
G Richie Williams, San Diego Sol
G Marlo Saunders, West Texas Whirlwinds
G Mike Dyson, Modesto Hawks
G James Doran, Sacramento Heatwave*
G Louis Kelly, Las Vegas Aces
G Jordan Boreman, East Bay Pitbulls
G Kenny Wilson, Texas Fuel
F O'Dell Bradley, Southeast Texas Mavericks*
F Devon Pearson, North Dallas Vandals
F Josh Pace, Southeast Texas Mavericks
C RaSheen Dickey, Colorado Kings
C Gene Shipley, San Diego Surf
* = Selected but unable to play.

Alternates
F/C Lamar Wright, Texas Fuel
G Mario Kinsey, Oklahoma Stallions
F/C Joe Rodgers, Louisiana United
F Matt Shaw, So Cal Swish

See also
2006 ABA All-Star Game
2007 ABA All-Star Game
2010-11 ABA season

External links
Official ABA site for the 2011 All-Star Game
Official Jacksonville Giants site for the 2011 All-Star Game

References

ABA All-Star Games
2010–11 in American basketball